Harald Gärtner (born 30 November 1968) is a German former professional footballer who played as a defender.

References

1968 births
Living people
German footballers
Association football defenders
Fortuna Düsseldorf players
SV Meppen players
Hannover 96 players
FC Admira Wacker Mödling players
SSV Jahn Regensburg players
SV Darmstadt 98 players
Austrian Football Bundesliga players
2. Bundesliga players
Regionalliga players
FC St. Pauli non-playing staff
German expatriate footballers
Danish expatriate sportspeople in Austria
Expatriate footballers in Austria